Paramore is an American rock band led by Hayley Williams

Paramore may also refer to:

People
 Jim Paramore (born 1939, as James Paramore) U.S. American football player, coach, official
 Junior Paramore (born 1968, as Peter Paramore) Samoan rugby union player

Music
 Paramore (album), a 2013 album by the eponymous band

Other uses
 Par Amore, a film production company set up by Bruce Parramore

See also

 
 
 
 Paramor (disambiguation)
 Paramour (disambiguation)
 Parramore (disambiguation)
 Par (disambiguation)
 Amore (disambiguation)